Boller may refer to: 

 Alfred P. Boller, civil engineer and bridge designer
 Kyle Boller, American Football NFL quarterback
 Pat Boller (born 1972), American ice hockey coach and executive
 Boller Brothers, architects

See also